Never Say Die is a memoir by Jack Hawkins, a lieutenant with the United States's 4th Marines in World War II. It was first published in 1961. 

The book relates Hawkins' experiences as a prisoner of war in Japanese prison camps after the American surrender in the Philippines. 

Long, careful and very secret planning was involved for this hazardous venture. Here is a list of some articles which had to be procured, taken out the gate, and stashed away in a safe place in the jungle, to be available at the appointed time: compass, sextant, chronometer, navigation tables, protractor, dividers, chart of the Southwest Pacific, pencils. Some of these items had to be hand-made. Each man had to have a change of clothing, blanket, shelter tent, mosquito net, canteen, mess kit, and food for five days. Medical supplies had to include quinine, sulfa drugs, first-aid kit, water purifier, and any other medicines they could get their hands on. Other equipment included bolo knives, field glasses, file, hammer, pliers, matches, cooking-can with handle. This indicates the kind of meticulous planning required for prisoners to effect an escape that had a chance to result in survival. ... Among other things, each man was chosen for certain basic qualities, such as character, physical fitness, desire and courage. Also, they were chosen for certain knowledge and/or technical skills required to do the job, and each man was assigned specific responsibilities. They were able to enlist a couple of Filipino ex-convicts still living in the area as advisers and guides, who were invaluable. 

When he and others finally escape from a camp, they join the American-Filipino guerrillas under the command of Lt. Col Wendell Fertig. Hawkins serves with Fertig for several months and is involved in numerous actions. For these actions he was later awarded the Distinguished Service Cross.

Also, an important point is that he persevered throughout the story. An important example is the scene where a group of soldiers and he escape from the POW camp and are met by a gang of guerrilla soldiers. After they prove to be friendly, one of the soldiers tells them that he was trying to shoot them but the cartridge was bad. This shows that those who persevere through hard times will be eventually rewarded. 

Then, with the help of the guerrilla soldiers, they go up north to get communications with an American submarine to come and take them to Australia where they could be safe and then rejoin the fighting.

Also, before escaping from a camp in Manila, Hawkins is held in a camp in Corregidor where the conditions are horrible and people lose all sense of discipline and do horrible things. People are dying left and right and they are all falling of disease. Then they are taken and sent to a camp in Manila., along with people in other camps.

Before being sent to the Corregidor, Hawkins and other soldiers had to march from their points of surrender to the camp. This march was nicknamed the March of Death because of how many died of disease, exhaustion. And those who could not continue were killed. The march to Manila (after a trip by sea) was less brutal, but still took lives. (In the camp in Manila, only the strong were sent to Manila to work. This helped soldiers improve conditions by secretly eating the food they harvested). Also the conditions were better because this was the lenient Major Maeda who was running the place, not strict lieutenant Hozumi.

Eventually evacuated to Australia by an American submarine, Hawkins later was involved in planning for the invasions of Iwo Jima and Okinawa. He stayed in the USMC after World War II and eventually retired as a full colonel.

Hawkins also talks about his fiancee, Rhea Ritter, who later becomes his wife. They met at the beginning of Hawkins' senior year at the Military Academy in September 1938. Their wedding took place at the Naval Academy Chapel.

References

Further reading
 Hawkins, J. 1961. Never say Die. Dorrance & Company, Inc. Philadelphia.
 How marine POWs hung tough, History Net.
 

1961 non-fiction books
World War II memoirs
Memoirs of imprisonment
Military history of the Philippines during World War II
Books about the Philippines